Route 3, also known as Goulds Bypass Road and Robert E. Howlett Memorial Drive, is a , two-lane, Partially-controlled access highway in the eastern part of the Avalon Peninsula of Newfoundland in the Canadian province of Newfoundland and Labrador. Its southern terminus is at Route 10 in Goulds and its northern terminus is at Route 2 in St. John's. The route is entirely in Division 1 and generally forms a straight line between its termini.

Route description

Route 3 begins at an intersection with Route 10 (Southern Shore Highway/Irish Loop Drive) in southern Goulds and heads northwest through wooded areas to cross a river via Raymond's Bridge and have an intersection with a gravel road before turning due north. It now passes through farmland as it bypasses Goulds along its west side, where it crosses over a few local roads including Powers Road and Cochrane Pond Road as well as having an intersection with Doyles Road. The highway now has an intersection with Ruby Line before entering the St. John's city limits and coming to an end shortly thereafter at an interchange with Route 2 (Pitts Memorial Drive), with the road continuing north as Commonwealth Avenue into downtown Mount Pearl.

For the majority of its length, Route 3 has a small gravel frontage road running along its southbound side.

Future

Route 3's northern terminus at Route 2 is also proposed to be the eventual southern terminus of Route 3's "alternate route", Route 3A (Team Gushue Highway). While currently unknown, it is speculated that once that connection is made, the entire route of the completed Route 3A will be completely renumbered as part of Route 3.

Major intersections

References

003
Streets in St. John's, Newfoundland and Labrador